Eslite Bookstore is one of the largest retail bookstore chains in Taiwan. It also offers one of the largest selections of English-language publications and translation materials in Taiwan. Its headquarters is in Xinyi District, Taipei.

Brief history
Eslite was established in 1989 by Robert Wu Ching-yu. The first shop was located in Dunhua South Road, Daan District, Taipei, with a focus and emphasis on art and humanities-related books. Since then, the company has expanded and set up more shops and increased its range of titles on offer. Eslite Bookstore was the first to set up a 24-hour bookstore in Taiwan at its Dunhua store, attracting night-time readers.

Eslite also expanded into retail, and opened up Eslite Mall.

Chronology
1974: established Chen-Jian Corp, importing whole set kitchenware.
1989: established Eslite Corp, first Eslite bookstore built at Taipei Dunhua South Road.
1996: established Eslite Retail Group.
2000: established Eslite Transportation Group, expanded to food and drinks, appliances, and online sales, established Eslite Global Network Corp.
2001: established Eslite Logistics Corp at Nankan, Taoyuan.
2002: Eslite Retail group and Transportation group combined into Life group, introduced Eslite's operation motto as humanity, art, creativity, and life.
At midnight on 1 January 2006, Eslite's new flagship bookstore, located in Taipei's Xinyi District, opened for business. With about 8,000 m² of floor space, it became the largest bookstore in Taiwan.

Branches
Eslite has a total of 38 branches in Taiwan. Most of its target market are in urban areas, such as Taipei, New Taipei, Keelung, Yilan, Zhongli, Hsinchu, Taichung, Chiayi, Tainan, Kaohsiung, and Pingtung.

The first Eslite Bookstore outside Taiwan opened in Hysan Place in Causeway Bay, Hong Kong in 2012. It sold 706,000 books in 2014. The company opened a second Hong Kong location at Star House (Star Annex of Harbour City), Tsim Sha Tsui in 2015.

On 29 November 2015, Eslite Bookstore opened up its first branch in China in the city of Suzhou, Jiangsu.

In 2022, Eslite opened its first bookstore in Southeast Asia in the heart of Kuala Lumpur, Malaysia on 17 December. It will be known under the name of Eslite Spectrum.

Related businesses
Eslite Musicstore
Eslite Coffeehouse
Eslite Winery
Eslite Teahouse
Eslite Gallery, founded in 1989. It is one of Taiwan's most prestigious contemporary art galleries.

Self-censorship controversy
In July 2014, Eslite Hong Kong pulled Tibet-related books off its shelves out of political concerns. Taiwanese media reported that Eslite Taiwan issued an in-company document prohibiting its workers from making comments about the company on social media without approval.

See also

List of companies of Taiwan
Page One
Taiwanese art

References

External links

Companies based in Taipei
Bookstores of Taiwan
Taiwanese brands
1989 establishments in Taiwan